The following notable deaths in the United States occurred in 2023. Names are reported under the date of death, in alphabetical order as set out in WP:NAMESORT.
A typical entry reports information in the following sequence:
Name, age, country of citizenship at birth and subsequent nationality (if applicable), what subject was noted for, year of birth (if known), and reference.

January

January 1
 Martin Davis, 94, mathematician (Davis–Putnam algorithm) (b. 1928)
 Gangsta Boo, 43, rapper (Three 6 Mafia) (b. 1979)
 Edith Lank, 96, author and advice columnist (b. 1926)
 Sebastian Marino, 57, guitarist (Overkill, Anvil) (b. 1965)
 Art McNally, 97, Hall of Fame football official, director of officiating for the NFL (1968–1991) (b. 1925)
 Kelly Monteith, 80, comedian (b. 1942)
 Meenakshi Narain, 58, experimental physicist (b. 1964)
 Edith Pearlman, 86, short story writer (b. 1936)
 Fred White, 67, Hall of Fame drummer (Earth, Wind & Fire) (b. 1955)
 January 2
 Lincoln Almond, 86, politician and lawyer, governor of Rhode Island (1995–2003), U.S. Attorney for the district of Rhode Island (1969–1978; 1981–1993) (b. 1936)
 Ken Block, 55, professional rally driver (b. 1967)
 Suzy McKee Charnas, 83, novelist (The Kingdom of Kevin Malone, The Holdfast Chronicles) and short story writer ("Boobs") (b. 1939)
 Molly Corbett Broad, 81, academic administrator (b. 1941)
 Buster Corley, 72, restaurateur, co-founder of Dave & Buster's (b. 1950)
 Catherine David, 73, French-born literary critic and novelist (b. 1949)
 Roxanne Donnery, 79, politician (b. 1943)
 Cai Emmons, 71, author and blogger (b. 1951)
 Frank Galati, 79, theatre director (The Grapes of Wrath, Ragtime) and screenwriter (The Accidental Tourist), Tony winner (1990) (b. 1943)
 Cliff Gustafson, 91, baseball coach (Texas Longhorns) (b. 1931)
 Bobby Hogue, 83, politician, member of the Arkansas House of Representatives (1979–1998) (b. 1939)
 Thomas L. Hughes, 97, government official, director of the Bureau of Intelligence and Research (1963–1969) (b. 1925)
 Marilyn Stafford, 97, American-born British photographer (b. 1925)
 Robert Stephan, 89, lawyer, Kansas attorney general (1979–1995) (b. 1933)
 January 3
 James D. Brubaker, 85, film producer (Bruce Almighty, Rocky, The Right Stuff) (b. 1937)
 Walter Cunningham, 90, astronaut (Apollo 7) (b. 1932)
 Bessie Hendricks, 115, supercentenarian (b. 1907)
 Greta Kiernan, 89, politician, member of the New Jersey General Assembly (1978–1980) (b. 1933)
† James Lowenstein, 95, diplomat, ambassador to Luxembourg (1977–1981) (b. 1927)
 Frederick J. Marshall, 71, judge, justice of the New York Supreme Court (2000–2022) (b. 1951)
† Robbie Pierce, 63, off-road racing driver (b. 1959)
 Nate Thayer, 62, journalist (Far Eastern Economic Review, Jane's Defence Weekly, Soldier of Fortune) (b. 1960)
 January 4
 Arthur Duncan, 97, tap dancer (The Lawrence Welk Show, The Betty White Show) (b. 1925)
 Norman Fruchter, 85, writer and academic (b. 1937)
 Casey Hayden, 85, civil rights activist (b. 1937)
 Elwood Hillis, 96, politician, member of the U.S. House of Representatives (1971–1987) (b. 1926)
 Stan Hitchcock, 86, country singer (b. 1936)
 Miiko Taka, 97, actress (Sayonara) (b. 1925)
 Calvin Muhammad, 64, football player (Los Angeles Raiders, Washington Redskins, San Diego Chargers) (b. 1958)
 January 5
 Jack Bender, 91, cartoonist (Alley Oop) (b. 1931)
 Earl Boen, 81, actor (Terminator, Monkey Island, Warcraft) (b. 1941)
 Mark Capps, 54, sound engineer (b. 1968)
 Nate Colbert, 76, baseball player (San Diego Padres, Houston Astros, Detroit Tigers) (b. 1946)
 Carl Duser, 90, baseball player (Kansas City Athletics) (b. 1932)
 Herbert Gintis, 82, economist, behavioral scientist and author (Schooling in Capitalist America) (b. 1940)
 Gordy Harmon, 79, soul singer (The Whispers) (b. 1943)
 Mike Hill, 73, film editor (Apollo 13, Rush, Frost/Nixon), Oscar winner (1996) (b. 1949)
 Russell Pearce, 75, politician, member (2006–2011) and president (2011) of the Arizona Senate (b. 1947)
 Dave Schubert, 49, street photographer (b. 1973)
 Ruth Adler Schnee, 99, German-born textile designer and interior designer (b. 1923)
 Quentin Williams, 39, politician, member of the Connecticut House of Representatives (since 2019) (b. 1983)
 January 6
 Benjamin Bederson, 101, physicist (Manhattan Project) (b. 1921)
 Fred Benners, 92, football player (New York Giants) (b. 1930)
 Jeff Blackburn, 77, songwriter ("My My, Hey Hey (Out of the Blue)") and guitarist (Blackburn & Snow, Moby Grape) (b. 1945)
 Bill Campbell, 74, baseball player (Minnesota Twins, Boston Red Sox, Chicago Cubs) (b. 1948)
 Lew Hunter, 87, screenwriter and screenwriting teacher (b. 1935)
 John Warren Johnson, 93, businessman and politician, member of the Minnesota House of Representatives (1966–1974) (b. 1929)
 Danny Kaleikini, 85, Hawaiian entertainer and singer (b. 1937)
 David S. Laustsen, 75, politician, member of the South Dakota House of Representatives (1977–1984) and senate (1985–1987) (b. 1947)
 Annette McCarthy, 64, actress (Twin Peaks, Creature, Baywatch) (b. 1958)
 Frank Molden, 80, football player (Los Angeles Rams, Philadelphia Eagles, New York Giants) (b. 1942)
 Theodore R. Newman Jr., 88, jurist, judge (1976–2016) and chief judge (1976–1984) of the D.C. Court of Appeals, judge of the Superior Court of D.C. (1970–1976) (b. 1934)
 Owen Roizman, 86, cinematographer (The Exorcist, Network, The French Connection) (b. 1936)
 Dick Savitt, 95, Hall of Fame tennis player (b. 1927)
 January 7
 Russell Banks, 82, novelist (Continental Drift, The Sweet Hereafter, Cloudsplitter) (b. 1940)
 Joseph A. Hardy III, 100, lumber industry executive, founder of 84 Lumber (b. 1923)
 Mary Ellen Hawkins, 99, politician, member of the Florida House of Representatives (1974–1994) (b. 1923)
 Naomi Replansky, 104, poet (b. 1918)
 Adam Rich, 54, actor (Eight Is Enough, Dungeons & Dragons, The Devil and Max Devlin) (b. 1968)
Dorothy Tristan, 88, actress (Klute, Scarecrow) and screenwriter (Weeds) (b. 1934)
 January 8
 Charles David Allis, 71, molecular biologist (b. 1951)
 Lynnette Hardaway, 51, conservative activist (Diamond and Silk) (b. 1951)
 Jack W. Hayford, 88, Pentecostal minister and hymn writer, founder of The King's University (b. 1934)
 Bernard Kalb, 100, journalist (Reliable Sources, The New York Times), assistant secretary of state for public affairs (1985–1986) (b. 1922)
 January 9
 Les Brown Jr., 82, musician, actor and producer (b. 1940)
 William Consovoy, 48, attorney (b. 1974)
 Melinda Dillon, 83, actress (Close Encounters of the Third Kind, A Christmas Story, Absence of Malice) (b. 1939)
 Ahmaad Galloway, 42, football player (Scottish Claymores, San Diego Chargers, Frankfurt Galaxy) (b. 1980)
 Virginia Kraft Payson, 92, thoroughbred horse breeder and sports journalist (Sports Illustrated) (b. 1930)
 Cincy Powell, 80, basketball player (Dallas Chaparrals, Kentucky Colonels, Virginia Squires) (b. 1942)
 Charles Simic, 84, Serbian-born poet (b. 1938)
 George S. Zimbel, 93, American-Canadian documentary photographer (b. 1929)
 January 10
 Donald Blom, 73, murderer (b. 1949)
 Dennis Budimir, 84, jazz and rock guitarist (The Wrecking Crew) (b. 1938)
 István Deák, 96, Hungarian-born historian, member of the Hungarian Academy of Sciences (b. 1926)
 Jeff Hamilton, 56, Olympic skier (b. 1966)
 Blake Hounshell, 44, journalist (b. 1978)
 Tyre Nichols, 29, delivery driver, subject of Tyre Nichols protests (b. 1993)
 Roy Schwitters, 78, physicist (b. 1944)
 Christopher T. Walsh, 78, biochemist, member of the National Academy of Sciences (b. 1944)
 January 11
 Peter Campbell, 62, water polo player, twice Olympic silver medallist (1984, 1988) (b. 1960)
 Carole Cook, 98, actress (The Lucy Show, The Incredible Mr. Limpet, Home on the Range) (b. 1924)
 Harriet Hall, 77, air force flight surgeon (b. 1945)
 Charles Kimbrough, 86, actor (Murphy Brown, The Hunchback of Notre Dame) (b. 1936)
 Ben Masters, 75, actor (All That Jazz, Dream Lover, Passions) (b. 1947)
 Eli Ostreicher, 39, British-born serial entrepreneur (b. 1983)
 Charles White, 64, football player (Cleveland Browns, Los Angeles Rams), Heisman Trophy winner (1979) (b. 1958)
 January 12
 Harold Brown, 98, Air Force officer (Tuskegee Airmen) (b. 1924)
 David Doctorian, 88, politician, member of the Missouri Senate (1977–1991) (b. 1934)
 Lisa Marie Presley, 54, singer-songwriter ("Lights Out"), and daughter of Elvis Presley (b. 1968)
 Lee Tinsley, 53, baseball player (Boston Red Sox, Seattle Mariners, Philadelphia Phillies) (b. 1969)
 Charles Treger, 87, violinist (b. 1935)
 Charlotte Vale-Allen, 81, Canadian-born contemporary fiction writer (b. 1941)
 Elliot Valenstein, 99, neuroscientist and psychologist (b. 1923)
 Bobby Wood, 87, politician, member of the Tennessee House of Representatives (1976–2004) (b. 1935)
 January 13
 Al Brown, 83, actor (The Wire) (b. 1939)
 Bill Davis, 80, baseball player (Cleveland Indians, San Diego Padres) (b. 1942)
 Robbie Knievel, 60, daredevil and stuntman (b. 1962)
 James L. Morse, 82, jurist, justice of the Vermont Supreme Court (1988–2003) (b. 1940)
 Thomasina Winslow, 57, blues musician (b. 1965)
 Yoshio Yoda, 88, Japanese-born actor (McHale's Navy) (b. 1934)
 January 14
 Keith Beaton, 72, singer (Blue Magic) (b. 1950) (death announced on this date)
 Wally Campo, 99, actor (Machine-Gun Kelly, The Little Shop of Horrors, Master of the World) (b. 1923)
 Craig Lowe, 65, politician, mayor of Gainesville (2010–2013) (b. 1957)
 January 15
 Ed Beard, 83, football player (San Francisco 49ers) (b. 1939)
 Victoria Chick, 86, economist (b. 1936)
 C. J. Harris, 31, singer (American Idol) (b. 1991).
 George McLeod, 92, basketball player (Baltimore Bullets) (b. 1931)
 Lloyd Morrisett, 93, psychologist and television producer (Sesame Street) (b. 1929)
 Ted Savage, 86, baseball player (St. Louis Cardinals, Chicago Cubs, Los Angeles Dodgers) (b. 1936)
 Jean Veloz, 98, dancer and actress (Swing Fever, Where Are Your Children?, Jive Junction) (b. 1924)
 January 16
 Johnny Powers, 84, rockabilly singer and guitarist (b. 1938)
 Arthur Ravenel Jr., 95, politician, member of the South Carolina House of Representatives and Senate, member of the U.S. House of Representatives (1987–1995) (b. 1927)
 Lupe Serrano, 92, Chilean-born ballerina (b. 1930)
 Rasul Siddik, 73, jazz trumpeter (b. 1949)
 Gary Smith, 64, record producer (b. 1958) 
 Jean-Pierre Swings, 79, American-born Belgian astronomer (b. 1943)
 Frank Thomas, 93, baseball player (New York Mets, Pittsburgh Pirates, Philadelphia Phillies) (b. 1929)
 January 17
 Jay Briscoe, 38, professional wrestler (ROH, CZW, NJPW) (b. 1984)
 John Bura, 78, Ukrainian Greek Catholic hierarch, auxiliary bishop of Philadelphia (2006–2019) (b. 1944)
 Van Conner, 55, bass guitarist (Screaming Trees) (b. 1967)
 Jerome R. Cox Jr., 97, computer pioneer, scientist and entrepreneur (b. 1925)
 T.J. deBlois, 38, drummer (A Life Once Lost) (b. 1984)
 Maria Dworzecka, 81, Polish-born physicist and Holocaust survivor (b. 1941)
 Chris Ford, 74, basketball player and coach (Detroit Pistons, Boston Celtics), NBA champion (1981) (b. 1948)
 William Thomas Hart, 93, jurist, judge of the U.S. District Court for Northern Illinois (since 1982)(b. 1929)
 Edward R. Pressman, 79, film producer (American Psycho, Conan the Barbarian) (b. 1943)
 Sandra Seacat, 86, acting coach (Andrew Garfield, Laura Dern) and actress (Under the Banner of Heaven) (b. 1936)
 January 18
 Donn Cambern, 93, film editor (Easy Rider, Romancing the Stone) (b. 1929)
 David Crosby, 81, Hall of Fame singer (The Byrds, Crosby, Stills, Nash & Young) and songwriter ("Almost Cut My Hair") (b. 1941)
 Robert Hersh, 82, lawyer (b. 1940)
 January 19
 Carin Goldberg, 69, graphic designer (b. 1953)
 Anton Walkes, 25, Charlotte FC English soccer player (b. 1997)
 George Rose, 81, football player (Minnesota Vikings, New Orleans Saints) (b. 1942)
 Ginger Stanley, 91, model, actress and stunt woman (Creature from the Black Lagoon, Jupiter's Darling, Revenge of the Creature) (b. 1931)
 Betty Lee Sung, 98, activist, author and academic (b. 1924)
 Bruce W. White, 70, businessman, founder of White Lodging (b. 1952)
 January 20
 †Sal Bando, 78, College Hall of Fame baseball player (Kansas City/Oakland Athletics, Milwaukee Brewers), World Series champion (1972, 1973, 1974) (b. 1944)
 Ted Bell, 76, novelist (b. 1947)
 Tom Birmingham, 73, politician, member (1991–2002) and president (1996–2002) of the Massachusetts Senate (b. 1949)
 Jerry Blavat, 82, DJ and radio presenter (b. 1940)
 Gwen Knapp, 61, sports journalist (The Philadelphia Inquirer, San Francisco Chronicle, The New York Times) (b. 1961)
 †Paul LaFarge, 52, novelist, essayist and academic (b. 1970)
 Michaela Paetsch, 61, violinist (b. 1961)
 Richard Steadman, 85, surgeon (b. 1937)
 Howard M. Tesher, 90, Thoroughbred horse racing trainer (b. 1932)
 Tom Villa, 77, politician, member of the Missouri House of Representatives (1974–1984, 2000–2008) (b. 1945)
 January 21
 B.G., the Prince of Rap, 57, rapper and Eurodance artist ("The Colour of My Dreams", "Can We Get Enough?") (b. 1965)
 Gary Pettigrew, 78, football player (Philadelphia Eagles, New York Giants) (b. 1944)
 Sal Piro, 72, fan club president (The Rocky Horror Picture Show) and author (Creatures of the Night) (b. 1950)
 Bill Schonely, 93, sports broadcaster (Portland Trail Blazers) (b. 1929)
 January 22
 Easley Blackwood Jr., 89, composer (Twelve Microtonal Etudes for Electronic Music Media), pianist, and professor (b. 1933)
 Lin Brehmer, 68, disc jockey and radio personality (WXRT) (b. 1954)
 Matthew H. Clark, 85, Roman Catholic prelate, bishop of Rochester (1979–2012) (b. 1937)
 Octaviano Juarez Corro, 49, Mexican-born fugitive (b. 1973)
 Sam Bass Warner Jr., 94, historian (b. 1928)
 January 23
 George Crabtree, 78, physicist (b. 1944)
 William Lawvere, 85, mathematician (b. 1937)
 Victor Navasky, 90, journalist (The Nation, Monocle, The New York Times Magazine) (b. 1932)
 Everett Quinton, 71, actor (Natural Born Killers, Pollock, Bros) (b. 1952)
 Carol Sloane, 85, jazz singer (b. 1937)
 January 24
 Lance Kerwin, 62, actor (James at 15, The Loneliest Runner, Salem's Lot) (b. 1960)
 Mira Lehr, 88, artist (b. 1934)
 Jackson Rohm, 51, singer-songwriter (b. 1971)
 January 25 
 Bernhard T. Mittemeyer, 92, lieutenant general (b. 1930)
 Willie Richardson, 74, civil rights activist (b. 1948)
 Cindy Williams, 75, actress (Happy Days, Laverne & Shirley, American Graffiti) (b. 1947)
 January 26
 Dave Albright, 63, football player (Saskatchewan Roughriders) (b. 1960)
 Dean Daughtry, 76, keyboard player (Classics IV, Atlanta Rhythm Section) (b. 1946)
 Jessie Lemonier, 25, football player (Los Angeles Chargers, Detroit Lions) (b. 1997)
 Peter McCann, 74, songwriter ("Do You Wanna Make Love", "Right Time of the Night") and musician (b. 1948)
 Billy Packer, 82, sports broadcaster and analyst (ACC, NCAA Final Four) (b. 1940)
 Gary Peters, 85, baseball player (Chicago White Sox, Boston Red Sox) (b. 1937)
 Allan Ryan, 77, attorney (b. 1945)
 Alice Wolf, 89, Austrian-born politician, member of the Massachusetts House of Representatives (1996–2013) (b. 1933)
 January 27
 Marcia G. Cooke, 68, jurist, judge on the U.S. District Court for the Southern District of Florida (since 2004) (b. 1954)
 Robert Dalva, 80, film editor (The Black Stallion, Captain America: The First Avenger, Jumanji) (b. 1942)
 Gregory Allen Howard, 70, screenwriter and film producer (Remember the Titans, Ali, Harriet) (b. 1952)
 Alfred Leslie, 95, painter and film director (Pull My Daisy) (b. 1927)
 Daniel Lewis Williams, 73, operatic basso profondo, (b. 1949)
 January 28
 Hilda Bettermann, 80, politician, member of the Minnesota House of Representatives (1991–1999) (b. 1942)
 Garth Everett, 69, politician, member of the Pennsylvania House of Representatives (2007–2020) (b. 1954)
 Kent Lockhart, 59, American-born Australian basketball player (Eastside Spectres, Albany Patroons) (b. 1963)
 Lisa Loring, 64, actress (The Addams Family) (b. 1958)
 Dan Ramos, 41, politician (b. 1981)
 Barrett Strong, 81, singer ("Money (That's What I Want)") and songwriter ("I Heard It Through the Grapevine", "Papa Was a Rollin' Stone") (b. 1941)
 Sidney Thornton, 68, football player (Pittsburgh Steelers) (b. 1954)
 Tom Verlaine, 73, musician (Television) and songwriter ("Marquee Moon", "Prove It") (b. 1949)
 January 29
 Bob Born, 98, candy manufacturer (Peeps), inventor of Hot Tamales (b. 1924)
 Henry Moore, 88, football player (New York Giants, Baltimore Colts) (b. 1934)
 Roger Schank, 76, artificial intelligence theorist (b. 1946)
 Kyle Smaine, 31, freestyle skier (b. 1991)
 Will Steffen, 75, American-born Australian climatologist and chemist (b. 1947)
 Annie Wersching, 45, actress (24, The Last of Us, Runaways) (b. 1977)
 January 30
 John Adams, 71, baseball superfan (Cleveland Guardians) and drummer (b. 1951)
 Bobby Beathard, 86, Pro Football Hall of Fame executive (b. 1937)
 Pat Bunch, 83, country music songwriter ("I'll Still Be Loving You", "Wild One", "Living in a Moment") (b. 1939)
 John Bailey Jones, 95, judge (b. 1927)
 Ann McLaughlin Korologos, 81, politician, U.S. secretary of labor (1987–1989) (b. 1941)
 Linda Pastan, 90, poet (b. 1932)
 Mike Schrunk, 80, district attorney (b. 1942)
 Charles Silverstein, 87, writer (The Joy of Gay Sex), therapist and gay activist (b. 1935)
 Pedo Terlaje, 76, politician, member of the Legislature of Guam (since 2019) (b. 1946)
 James Alexander Thom, 89, author (b. 1933)
 Jeff Vlaming, 63, television writer and producer (The X-Files, Lois & Clark: The New Adventures of Superman, Northern Exposure and Hannibal) (death announced on this date)
 January 31
 Cleve Bryant, 75, college football player (Ohio Bobcats) and coach (Illinois Fighting Illini, Texas Longhorns) (b. 1947)
 Lou Campanelli, 84, basketball coach (James Madison Dukes, California Golden Bears) (b. 1938)
 David Durenberger, 88, politician, member of the U.S. Senate (1978–1995) (b. 1934)
 Dave Elder, 47, baseball player (Cleveland Indians) (b. 1975)
 Donnie Marsico, 68, singer (The Jaggerz) (b. 1954)
 Joe Moss, 92, football player (Washington Redskins) and coach (Philadelphia Eagles, Toronto Argonauts) (b. 1930)
 Charlie Thomas, 85, Hall of Fame singer (The Drifters) (b. 1937) (death announced on this date)

February

 February 1
 Joanne Bracker, 77, Hall of Fame college basketball coach (Midland University) (b. 1945)
 Don Bramlett, 60, football player (Minnesota Vikings) (b. 1962)
 Franklin Florence, 88, civil rights activist (b. 1934)
 Roland Muhlen, 80, Olympic sprint canoer (1972, 1976) (b. 1942)
 George P. Wilbur, 81, actor (Halloween 4: The Return of Michael Myers, Halloween: The Curse of Michael Myers, Remote Control) and stuntman (b. 1941)
 Stanley Wilson Jr., 40, football player (Detroit Lions) (b. 1982)
 February 2
 Ron Campbell, 82, baseball player (Chicago Cubs) (b. 1940)
 Chris Chesser, 74, film producer (Major League, The Rundown, Bad Day on the Block) (b. 1948)
 Kenny Jay, 85, professional wrestler (AWA) (b. 1937) (death announced on this date)
 Butch Miles, 78, jazz drummer (b. 1944)
 Robert Orben, 95, comedian and speechwriter (b. 1927)
 Lanny Poffo, 68, professional wrestler (NWA, WWF) (b. 1954)
 James C. Wofford, 78, equestrian, Olympic silver medalist (1968, 1972) (b. 1944)
 February 3
 Paul Janovitz, 54, musician (Cold Water Flat) and photographer (b. 1968)
 Lawrence M. McKenna, 89, jurist, judge of the U.S. District Court for Southern New York (since 1990) (b. 1933)
 Joan Oates, 94, archaeologist and academic (b. 1928)
 Irving Stern, 94, politician, member of the Minnesota Senate (1979–1982) (b. 1928)
 Jack Taylor, 94, broadcaster (b. 1928) 
 February 4
 Susan Duhan Felix, 85, ceramic artist (b. 1937)
 Adrian Hall, 95, theatre director (b. 1927)
 Marv Kellum, 70, football player (Pittsburgh Steelers, St. Louis Cardinals) (b. 1952)
 Floyd Kerr, 76, basketball player (Colorado State Rams) (b. 1946)
 Pete Koegel, 75, baseball player (Milwaukee Brewers, Philadelphia Phillies) (b. 1947)
 Paul Martha, 80, football player (Pittsburgh Steelers) and executive (San Francisco 49ers) (b. 1942)
 Arnold Schulman, 97, screenwriter (Love with the Proper Stranger, Goodbye, Columbus) (b. 1925)
 Steve Sostak, 49, rock singer (Sweep the Leg Johnny) (b. 1973)
 Jerry W. Tillman, 82, politician, member of the North Carolina Senate (2003–2020) (b. 1940)
 Ron Tompkins, 78, baseball player (Kansas City Athletics, Chicago Cubs) (b. 1944)
 Harry Whittington, 95, attorney and political figure (Dick Cheney hunting accident) (b. 1927)
 February 5
 Hank Beebe, 96, composer (Bathtubs Over Broadway) (b. 1926)
 Chris Browne, 70, cartoonist (Hägar the Horrible) (b. 1952)
 Demetrius Calip, 53, basketball player (Los Angeles Lakers) (b. 1969)
 Inge Sargent, 90, Austrian-born author and human rights activist, queen consort of Hsipaw State (1953–1962) (b. 1932)
 Kaye Vaughan, 91, Hall of Fame football player (Ottawa Rough Riders) (b. 1931)
 Lillian Walker, 78, singer (The Exciters) (b. 1944)
 February 6
 David Harris, 76, journalist and anti-war activist (b. 1946)
 Emory Kristof, 80, photographer (b. 1942)
 Eugene Lee, 83, set designer (Saturday Night Live, Candide, Sweeney Todd: The Demon Barber of Fleet Street) (b. 1939)
 Charlie Norris, 57, professional wrestler (b. 1965)
 February 7
 Lee Greenfield, 81, politician, member of the Minnesota House of Representatives (1979–2001) (b. 1941)
 Tonya Knight, 56, professional bodybuilder and game show contestant (American Gladiators) (b. 1966)
 Andrew J. McKenna, 93, businessman, chairman of McDonald's (2004–2016) (b. 1929)
 February 8
 Burt Bacharach, 94, Hall of Fame composer ("Raindrops Keep Fallin' on My Head", "Walk On By", "Arthur's Theme (Best That You Can Do)"), six-time Grammy winner (b. 1928)
 Shirley Fulton, 71, judge (North Carolina Superior Court) (b. 1952)
 Cody Longo, 34, actor (Days of Our Lives, Hollywood Heights, Piranha 3D) (b. 1988)
 Oscar Lawton Wilkerson, 96, pilot (Tuskegee Airmen) and radio personality (b. 1926)
 February 9
 Jean Anderson, 93, cookbook author (b. 1929) (death announced on this date)
 Doug Mattis, 56, figure skater (b. 1966)
 Nelson Rising, 81, businessman (Federal Reserve Bank of San Francisco) (b. 1941)
 Dimitrious Stanley, 48, football player (New Jersey Red Dogs, Winnipeg Blue Bombers) (b. 1974)
 February 10
 Morris J. Amitay, 86, administrator, executive director of the American Israel Public Affairs Committee (1974–1980) (b. 1936)
 Len Birman, 90, Canadian-born actor (Silver Streak, Generations, Captain America) (b. 1932)
 Larry Coyer, 79, football coach (Tampa Bay Buccaneers, Denver Broncos, Indianapolis Colts) (b. 1943)
 Michael Green, 69, molecular and cell biologist (b. 1954)
 February 11
 Howard Bragman, 66, public relations executive (b. 1956)
 Robert Dean Hunter, 94, politician, member of the Texas House of Representatives (1986–2007) (b. 1928)
 Lee James, 69, weightlifter, Olympic silver medalist (1976)(b. 1953)
 , 27, actor (NYPD Blue, Treasure Planet, The Ant Bully) (b. 1995)
 Donald Spoto, 81, biographer (b. 1941)
 February 12
 Roger Bobo, 84, tuba player (b. 1938)
 Doug Fisher, 75, football player (Pittsburgh Steelers) (b. 1947)
 David Jude Jolicoeur, 54, rapper (De La Soul) and songwriter ("Me Myself and I", "Feel Good Inc."), Grammy winner (2006) (b. 1968)
 Ted Lerner, 97, real estate developer, owner of the Washington Nationals (since 2006) and founder of Lerner Enterprises, pneumonia (b. 1925)
 Linda King Newell, 82, historian and Mormon scholar (b. 1941)
 J. Paul Taylor, 102, politician, member of the New Mexico House of Representatives (1987–2005) (b. 1920)
 W. Russell Todd, 94, United States Army general (b. 1928)
 February 13
 Tim Aymar, 59, heavy metal singer (Pharaoh) (b. 1963)
 Marshall "Eddie" Conway, 76, Black Panther Party leader (b. 1946)
 Roger Bonk, 78, football player (North Dakota Fighting Sioux, Winnipeg Blue Bombers) (b. 1944)
 Conrad Dobler, 72, football player (St. Louis Cardinals, New Orleans Saints, Buffalo Bills) (b. 1950)
 Brian DuBois, 55, baseball player (Detroit Tigers) (b. 1967)
 Robert Geddes, 99, architect, dean of the Princeton University School of Architecture (1965–1982) (b. 1923)
 Tom Luddy, 79, film producer (Barfly, The Secret Garden), co-founder of the Telluride Film Festival (b. 1943)
 David Singmaster, 84, mathematician (b. 1938)
 Huey "Piano" Smith, 89, R&B pianist and songwriter ("Rockin' Pneumonia and the Boogie Woogie Flu") (b. 1934)
 Jesse Treviño, 76, Mexican-born painter, throat cancer (b. 1946)
 Spencer Wiggins, 81, soul singer (b. 1942)
 February 14
 Afternoon Deelites, 31, thoroughbred racehorse (b. 1992)
 Charley Ferguson, 83, football player (Buffalo Bills, Cleveland Browns, Minnesota Vikings) (b. 1939)
 Emil C. Gotschlich, 88, chemist, developer of the meningitis vaccine (b. 1935)
 Allen Green, 84, football player (Dallas Cowboys) (b. 1938)
 Gary L. Harrell, 71, United States Army general (b. 1951)
 Jerry Jarrett, 80, professional wrestler (NWA) and wrestling promoter, founder of CWA (b. 1942)
 Greg McMackin, 77, football coach (Oregon Tech Hustlin' Owls, Hawaii Warriors) (b. 1945)
 Neale Stoner, 86, sports coach and athletic director (b. 1936)
 John M. Veitch, 77, Hall of Fame racehorse trainer (b. 1945)
 February 15
 Paul Berg, 96, biochemist, Nobel Prize laureate (1980) (b. 1926)
 Thomas Dortch, 72, businessman and civil rights leader (b. 1950)
 Catherine McArdle Kelleher, 84, political scientist (b. 1939)
 David Oreck, 99, entrepreneur (b. 1923)
 Raquel Welch, 82, actress (One Million Years B.C., The Three Musketeers, Fantastic Voyage) (b. 1940)
 John E. Woods, 80, translator (b. 1942)
 February 16
 Simone Edwards, 49, basketball player (New York Liberty, Seattle Storm) (b. 1973)
 Chuck Jackson, 85, R&B singer ("Any Day Now", "I Keep Forgettin'", "Tell Him I'm Not Home") (b. 1937)
 Tim McCarver, 81, baseball player (St. Louis Cardinals, Philadelphia Phillies) and broadcaster (Fox Sports) (b. 1941)
 Hank Skinner, 60, killer (b. 1962)
 February 17
 Otis Barthoulameu, 70, musician (Fluf, Olivelawn) and record producer (Cheshire Cat) (b. 1952) (death announced on this date)
 Rebecca Blank, 67, economist and academic administrator, acting secretary of commerce (2011, 2012–2013) and chancellor of the University of Wisconsin-Madison (2013–2022) (b. 1955)
 Jerry Dodgion, 90, jazz saxophonist and flautist (b. 1932)
 Gerald Fried, 95, composer (Gilligan's Island, Star Trek: The Original Series, Roots) (b. 1928)
 Kyle Jacobs, 49, songwriter ("More Than a Memory") (b. 1973)
 James A. Joseph, 88, diplomat, ambassador to South Africa (1996–1999) (b. 1935)
 Stella Stevens, 84, actress (Girls! Girls! Girls!, The Nutty Professor, The Poseidon Adventure) (b. 1938)
 Tom Whitlock, 68, songwriter ("Danger Zone", "Take My Breath Away", "Winner Takes It All"), Oscar winner (1987) (b. 1954)
 February 18
 Barbara Bosson, 83, actress (Hill Street Blues) (b. 1939)
 Jim Broyhill, 95, politician, member of the U.S. House of Representatives (1963–1986) and Senate (1986) (b. 1927)
 Thomas R. Donahue, 94, labor leader, president of the AFL–CIO (1995), complications from a fall (b. 1928)
 Ammon McNeely, 52, rock climber (b. 1970)
 David G. O'Connell, 69, Irish-born Roman Catholic prelate, auxiliary bishop of Los Angeles (since 2015) (b. 1953)
 Justin O. Schmidt, 75, entomologist (b. 1947)
 Richard H. Tilly, 90, economic historian (b. 1932)
 February 19
 Richard Belzer, 78, actor (Homicide: Life on the Street, Law & Order: Special Victims Unit, The Flash), stand-up comedian, and author (b. 1944)
 Davis Causey, 74, guitarist (Sea Level) (b. 1948)
 Greg Foster, 64, hurdler, Olympic silver medallist (1984) (b. 1958)
 David Lance Goines, 77, artist (b. 1945)
 Red McCombs, 95, businessman and sports team owner (San Antonio Spurs, Minnesota Vikings), co-founder of iHeartMedia (b. 1927)
 Jim McMillin, 85, football player (Denver Broncos, Oakland Raiders) (b. 1937)
 Jansen Panettiere, 28, actor (The Secrets of Jonathan Sperry, The Perfect Game, Robots) (b. 1994)
 February 20
 Bruce Barthol, 75, bassist (Country Joe and the Fish) (b. 1947)
 Michael S. Heiser, 60, biblical scholar and author (b. 1963)
 John Hitt, 82, academic administrator, president of the University of Central Florida (1992–2018) (b. 1940)
 February 21
 Ron Altbach, 76, keyboardist (King Harvest, Celebration) and songwriter ("Alone on Christmas Day") (b. 1946)
 Zandra Flemister, 71, diplomat (b. 1951)
 Jesse Gress, 67, rock guitarist (b. 1956)
 Albie Pearson, 88, baseball player (Los Angeles/California Angels, Washington Senators, Baltimore Orioles) (b. 1934)
 Rayford Price, 86, politician, member (1961–1973) and speaker (1972–1973) of the Texas House of Representatives (b. 1937)
 February 22
 Howard R. Lamar, 99, historian, president of Yale University (1992–1993) (b. 1923)
 Dylan Lyons, 24, television journalist (Spectrum News 13) (b. 1998)
 Augie Nieto, 65, businessman, founder of Life Fitness (b. 1958)
 February 23
 Donald Dillbeck, 59, convicted murderer (b. 1963)
 Tony Earl, 86, politician, governor of Wisconsin (1983–1987) and member of the Wisconsin State Assembly (1969–1975) (b. 1936)
 Thomas H. Lee, 78, financier, founder of Thomas H. Lee Partners and Lee Equity Partners (b. 1944)
 John Olver, 86, politician, member of the U.S. House of Representatives (1991–2013), member of the Massachusetts Senate (1973–1991) and House of Representatives (1969–1973) (b. 1936)
 Allen Steck, 96, mountaineer and rock climber (b. 1926)
 February 24
 James Abourezk, 92, politician, member of the U.S. House of Representatives (1971–1973) and Senate (1973–1979) (b. 1931)
 Michael Blackwood, 88, documentary filmmaker (b. 1934)
 Ed Fury, 94, bodybuilder and actor (Ursus, The Seven Revenges Ursus in the Land of Fire) (b. 1928)
 Walter Mirisch, 101, film producer (In the Heat of the Night, Midway, The Hawaiians), Oscar winner (1967) (b. 1921)
 David L. Starling, 73, railroad executive (b. 1949)
 February 25
 Jack Billion, 83, politician, member of the South Dakota House of Representatives (1993–1997) (b. 1939)
 Kris Jordan, 46, politician, member of the Ohio House of Representatives (2009–2010, since 2019) and Senate (2011–2018) (b. 1977)
 Fred Miller, 82, football player (Baltimore Colts) (b. 1940)
 Dave Nicholson, 83, baseball player (Baltimore Orioles, Chicago White Sox, Houston Astros) (b. 1939)
 Carl Saunders, 80, trumpeter, composer and educator (b. 1942)
 Richard Trefry, 98, army lieutenant general (b. 1924)
 February 26
 Terry Holland, 80, basketball coach (Virginia Cavaliers) (b. 1942)
 Gus Franklin Mutscher, 90, politician, speaker of the Texas House of Representatives (1969–1972) (b. 1932)
 Bob Richards, 97, pole vaulter and politician, Olympic champion (1952, 1956) (b. 1926)
 Fred Shabel, 90, basketball coach (UConn Huskies) (b. 1932)
 February 27
 Ricou Browning, 93, actor (Creature from the Black Lagoon, Revenge of the Creature) and television director (Flipper) (b. 1930)
 Burny Mattinson, 87, animator (The Jungle Book, The Great Mouse Detective, Robin Hood) (b. 1935)
 Jerry Simmons, 76, tennis coach (LSU Tigers) (b. 1946)
 February 28
 Michael Botticelli, 63, Olympic figure skater (1980) (b. 1959)
 Brian J. Donnelly, 76, politician and diplomat, member of the U.S. House of Representatives (1979–1993) and ambassador to Trinidad and Tobago (1994–1997) (b. 1946)
 Jean Faut, 97, baseball player (South Bend Blue Sox) (b. 1925)
 Bo Hickey, 77, football player (Montreal Alouettes, Brooklyn Dodgers, Denver Broncos) (b. 1945)
 Jay Weston, 93, film producer (Lady Sings the Blues, Buddy Buddy) (b. 1929)

March

 March 1
 Ted Donaldson, 89, actor (A Tree Grows in Brooklyn, Adventures of Rusty, Father Knows Best) (b. 1933)
 Leon Hughes, 92, musician (The Coasters) (b. 1930)
 Dan McGinn, 79, baseball player (Montreal Expos, Chicago Cubs, Cincinnati Reds) (b. 1943)
 Jerry Richardson, 86, football player (Baltimore Colts) and executive (Carolina Panthers) (b. 1936)
 March 2
 Lokenath Debnath, 87, Indian-born mathematician, founder of the International Journal of Mathematics and Mathematical Sciences (b. 1935)
 Phil Hopkins, 73, basketball coach (Western Carolina Catamounts) (b. 1949)
 Theodore Kanamine, 93, brigadier general (b. 1929)
 Dell Raybould, 89, politician, member of the Idaho House of Representatives (2000–2018) (b. 1933)
 C. Paul Robinson, 81, physicist (b. 1941)
 Wayne Shorter, 89, jazz saxophonist (Miles Davis Quintet, Weather Report, The Jazz Messengers), 12-time Grammy winner (b. 1933)
 March 3 
 Barbara Everitt Bryant, 96, market researcher, director of the United States Census Bureau (1989–1993) (b. 1926)
 Carlos Garnett, 84, Panamanian-born jazz saxophonist (b. 1938)
 Sara Lane, 73, actress (The Virginian, I Saw What You Did) (b. 1949)
 David Lindley, 78, musician (Kaleidoscope) and singer (“Mercury Blues”) (b. 1944)
 Calvin Newton, 93, gospel singer (The Oak Ridge Boys, Sons of Song) (b. 1929)
 Tom Sizemore, 61, actor (Natural Born Killers, Heat, Saving Private Ryan, Black Hawk Down) (b. 1961)
 Lou Stovall, 86, painter (b. 1937)
 March 4
 Phil Batt, 96, politician, governor of Idaho (1995–1999), member of the Idaho House of Representatives (1965–1967) and twice of the Senate (b. 1927)
 Robert Haimer, 69, musician (Barnes & Barnes) and songwriter ("Fish Heads") (b. 1954)
 Judith Heumann, 75, disability rights activist (b. 1947)
 Michael Rhodes, 69, bass player (b. 1953)
 Andre Smith, 64, basketball player (Nebraska Cornhuskers) (b. 1958)
 Donald Snyder, 71, politician, member of the Pennsylvania House of Representatives (1981–2000) (b. 1951)
 Spot, 72, record producer (Damaged, Milo Goes to College, Zen Arcade) (b. 1951)
 March 5
 Francisco J. Ayala, 88, Spanish-born evolutionary biologist and philosopher (b. 1934)
 Bob Goodman, 83, Hall of Fame boxing promoter (b. 1939)
 Frank Griswold, 85, clergyman, presiding bishop of the Episcopal Church (1998–2006) (b. 1937)
 Tom Hsieh, 91, politician, member of the San Francisco Board of Supervisors (1986–1997) (b. 1931)
 Ilkka Järvi-Laturi, 61, Finnish-born film director (Spy Games) (b. 1961)
 Gary Rossington, 71, Hall of Fame guitarist (Lynyrd Skynyrd, Rossington Collins Band) (b. 1951)
 Dave Wills, 58, sportscaster (Tampa Bay Rays) (b. 1964)
 March 6
 Harvey Carignan, 95 serial killer (b. 1927)
 Sergey Grishin, 56, Russian-born businessman and engineer (b. 1966)
 Traute Lafrenz, 103, German-born resistance fighter (White Rose) (b. 1919)
 Eric Alan Livingston, 38, musician (Mamaleek) (b. 1984)
 Wally Smith, 96, British-born mathematician (b. 1926)
 March 7
 Ian Falconer, 63, author (Olivia) and illustrator (The New Yorker) (b. 1959)
 Tom Love, 85, entrepreneur, founder of Love's (b. 1937)
 Pat McCormick, 92, diver, four-time Olympic champion (1952, 1956) (b. 1930)
 Peterson Zah, 85, politician, president of the Navajo Nation (1991–1995) (b. 1937)
 March 8
 Jim Durkin, 58, thrash metal guitarist (Dark Angel) (b. 1964)
 Bert I. Gordon, 100, film director and screenwriter (Village of the Giants, Empire of the Ants, The Amazing Colossal Man) (b. 1922)
 Dolores Klaich, 86, author and activist (b. 1936)
 Jim Moeller, 67, politician, member of the Washington House of Representatives (2003–2017) (b. 1955)
 Tish Naghise, 59, politician, member of the Georgia House of Representatives (since 2023) (b. 1963)
 Abraham Zarem, 106, scientist (Manhattan Project) (b. 1917)
 March 9
 Robert Blake, 89, actor (Baretta, In Cold Blood, Electra Glide in Blue, Lost Highway) (b. 1933)
 William R. Cotter, 87, lawyer, president of Colby College (1979–2000) (b. 1936)
 Mark Crutcher, 74, anti-abortion activist and author, founder of Life Dynamics Inc. (b. 1948)
 Otis Taylor, 80, football player (Kansas City Chiefs), Super Bowl champion (1970) (b. 1942) 
 March 10
 Jesús Alou, 80, Dominican baseball player (San Francisco Giants, Houston Astros, Oakland Athletics) (b. 1942)
 Kevin Freeman, 81, equestrian, Olympic silver medalist (1964, 1968, 1972) (b. 1941)
 Dick Haley, 85, football player (Washington Redskins, Minnesota Vikings, Pittsburgh Steelers) (b. 1937)
 Rolland Hein, 90, college professor and scholar (b. 1932)
 Napoleon XIV, 84, singer ("They're Coming to Take Me Away, Ha-Haaa!") (b. 1938)
 Demetrio Perez Jr, 77, Cuban-born educator and politician (b. 1945)
 Anthony Verga, 87, politician, member of the Massachusetts House of Representatives (1995–2009) (b. 1935)
 March 11
 Amy Fuller, 54, rower, Olympic silver medalist (1992) (b. 1968)
 Bud Grant, 95, basketball player (Minneapolis Lakers), Hall of Fame football player (Winnipeg Blue Bombers) and coach (Minnesota Vikings) (b. 1927)
 John Jakes, 90, author (North and South, The Kent Family Chronicles) (b. 1932)
 March 12
 Chris Cooper, 44, American-Italian baseball player (San Marino Baseball Club, Italy national team) (b. 1978)
 Rolly Crump, 93, animator (Lady and the Tramp, Sleeping Beauty, One Hundred and One Dalmatians) and designer (b. 1930)
 Dix Denney, 65, guitarist (The Weirdos, Thelonious Monster) (b. 1957)
 Dick Fosbury, 76, high jumper (Fosbury Flop), Olympic champion (1968) (b. 1947)
 Felton Spencer, 55, basketball player (Minnesota Timberwolves, Utah Jazz, Golden State Warriors) (b. 1968)
 March 13
 Nicholas Calabrese, 80, contract killer (b. 1942)
 Jim Gordon, 77, musician (Derek and the Dominos), songwriter ("Layla") and convicted murderer (b. 1945)
 Edward Leavy, 93, jurist, judge on the U.S. District Court for Oregon (1984–1987) and U.S. Court of Appeals for the Ninth Circuit (since 1987) (b. 1929)
 Joe Pepitone, 82, baseball player (New York Yankees, Houston Astros, Chicago Cubs), World Series champion (1962) (b. 1940)
 Pat Schroeder, 82, politician, member of the U.S. House of Representatives (1973–1997) (b. 1940)
 March 14
 Bobby Caldwell, 71, singer ("What You Won't Do for Love") and songwriter ("The Next Time I Fall") (b. 1951)
 Jim Ferree, 91, golfer (b. 1931)
 Antonina Uccello, 100, politician, mayor of Hartford (1967–1971) (b. 1922)
 March 15
 Jeff Gaylord, 64, professional wrestler (UWF, WCCW) and football player (Toronto Argonauts) (b. 1958)
 Ronald Rice, 77, politician, member of the New Jersey Senate (1986–2022) (b. 1945)
 March 17
 Hal Dresner, 85, screenwriter  (The Eiger Sanction, Zorro, The Gay Blade, Sssssss) (b. 1937) 
 Fuzzy Haskins, 81, Hall of Fame singer (Parliament-Funkadelic) (b. 1941)
 John Jenrette, 86, politician, member of the U.S. House of Representatives (1975–1980), member of the South Carolina House of Representatives (1964–1972) (b. 1936)
 Lance Reddick, 60, actor (The Wire, Fringe, John Wick) (b. 1962)
Guy Troy, 100, Olympic pentathlete (1952) and United States Army officer (b. 1923)
 March 18
 Gloria Dea, 100, actress (King of the Congo, Plan 9 from Outer Space) and magician (b. 1922)
 Steven Ungerleider, 73, sports psychologist, author and documentary film producer (Munich '72 and Beyond, End Game, Citizen Ashe) (b. 1949)
 Dot Wilkinson, 101, Hall of Fame bowler and softball player (b. 1921)
 March 19
 Willie Cager, 81, basketball player (Texas Western Miners) (b. 1941)

April

References

+
Deaths
2023